King Street  is a street in the Sydney central business district in New South Wales, Australia. It stretches from King Street Wharf and Lime Street near Darling Harbour in the west, to Queens Square at St James railway station in the east.

History and description
King Street was named after Governor Phillip Gidley King, the third Governor of New South Wales.

The Watsons Bay tramway ran down King Street until its closure and replacement by buses in 1960.

King Street provides the northern border of Pitt Street Mall. 25 Martin Place is a skyscraper that sits on the corner of Castlereagh Street. Other prominent buildings along King Street include the Supreme Court of New South Wales, St James Church and St James campus of the Sydney Law School.

See also

 Geography of Sydney

References

External links

 

 
Streets in Sydney